is an Italian-Japanese anime, based on the western character Zorro. The series was initially broadcast in Italy in 1994 before being broadcast in Japan two years later, albeit with some episodes skipped (only 46 of the original 52 episodes were shown in Japan).

Plot 
Diego Vega, the eighteen-year-old scion of a local landowner, returns from studying in Spain and discovers that his homeland has fallen under the dictatorship of Commander Raymond and Lieutenant Gabriel. Outraged by the oppression, Diego decides to fight the tyrants. Disguised as Zorro, a masked swordsman, he helps the weak, riding away on his horse, Viento.

In his day-to-day life, Diego portrays himself as a clumsy and cowardly boy who flees when faced with dangerous situations only to appear moments later as Zorro. As the local hero, he is known to punish his enemies by cutting a "Z" shaped mark into them with the tip of his blade. Diego is accompanied by Bernard, his sidekick, who wears a similar costume and has the nickname "Little Zorro."

Diego's childhood friend and sweetheart, Lolita Prideaux, believes that Spain changed him and she scolds him relentlessly for his idiotic behavior. Lolita is a sweet-tempered girl who wants to fight evil and protect the people by helping Zorro from behind the scenes. She later develops feelings for Zorro, though she is unaware of his true identity.

Characters 
Don Diego Vega/Zorro
 (English)
The main protagonist of the series. As Diego, he pretends to be lazy and clumsy, playing the role of a cowardly fool to hide his secret identity. As Zorro, he is the most noble-minded swordsman in the world. Diego is a rival of Captain Raymond but feels a deep affection for the other man. Diego is calm and reasonable, contrasting with his hot-headed and stubborn companions.
Lolita Prideaux
 (Japanese)
The female protagonist of the series. Diego's spunky and beautiful, blond childhood friend and love interest. She acts bossy towards Diego, but she has romantic feelings for Zorro.
Bernard/Little Zorro
 (English)
Diego/Zorro's sidekick, an abandoned orphan found by Diego when he was still a baby. Diego adopted and took care of him as if he was his younger brother. He helps Zorro by eavesdropping and gathering information, and later develops his own alter ego, "Little Zorro."
Commander Raymond
 (Japanese)
The main villain of the series, commander of the Spanish Army in California who plots to assassinate the Governor-General.
Lieutenant Gabriel
 (Japanese)
A young Spanish officer who serves as Captain Raymond's right-hand man in California. Lt. Gabriel has feelings for Lolita.
Don Alejandro Vega
 (Japanese)
Diego's father. Wealthy landowner and field worker.
Sergeant Pedro Gonzales
 (Japanese)
A stout sergeant who often serves as comic relief. Comparable to Johnston McCulley's character from 1920's The Mark of Zorro. He has a good moral sense but remains gluttonous and simple-minded within the army.
Don Carlos Prideaux

Lolita's father.
Catarina Prideaux

Lolita's mother.
Maria

The Vega's housemaid. She is very masculine, boisterous, and not afraid to scold - but takes care of the kids with much fondness. 
Viento

Zorro's horse.
Tackle

Diego's lazy hunting dog
Figaro

Bernard's helpful bulldog.
Nikita

Bernard's love interest.
Manuel

One of Bernard's best friends.
Sergio

One of Bernard's best friends.
Leona

One of Bernard's best friends, a girl who looks like a boy.
Governor-General

In charge of the Californian branch of the army (and town by extension).
Captain Jekyll

Brown

Kapital

Episode list

The Legend of Zorro (1996)

Music 
The series soundtrack contains two pieces of thematic music. The opening theme is titled "Zorro", and the closing theme "Chikai" (誓い; "Oath"). Both are sung by Masaaki Endoh and are used for all aired episodes.

References

External links 
 Official anime website of Production Reed  
 Official anime website of Production Reed 
  on MONDO TV
 
 

1996 anime television series debuts
Italian children's animated action television series
Italian children's animated adventure television series
Italian children's animated superhero television series
Japanese children's animated action television series
Japanese children's animated adventure television series
Japanese children's animated superhero television series
Action anime and manga
Adventure anime and manga
Historical anime and manga
NHK original programming
Ashi Productions
Zorro television series
Television shows set in California
Television series set in the 1800s
Spanish Empire in fiction
Superheroes in anime and manga